Metehan  is a masculine Turkish given name.

Mete results from Turkish derivation of standard Chinese "Modu"  "墨毒" (< Middle Chinese /*mək-duok/). Modu 墨毒 (< Middle Chinese: *mək-duok) was a reading proposed by 11th-century historian Song Qi for a Xiongnu word which had been transcribed centuries earlier by Sima Qian as 冒顿 Mòdùn < Middle Chinese mək̚-tuənH (ZS) < Eastern Han Chinese *mǝk-tuənC, the name of the Modun Chanyu, the founder of Xiongnu Empire. 冒顿 might have transcribed the Xiongnu title reconstructed as *baɣtur, linguistically related to the Turkic honorific title "Baghatur". Baghatur is also used as a masculine given name by Turkish people as Bahadır, Batur, and as in other cognate forms. "Han" is the Turkish derivative of "Khan" and is cognate with Hakan, a common masculine Turkish given name. Mete Han is from the Oghuz boy.

N.Ya. Bichurin notices many similarities between the two legends about Modun Chanyu, whose name is the basis of Metehan, and Oghuz Khan (Collection of information, pp. 56–57).

Given name 
Metehan Başar (born 1991), Turkish wrestler

Turkish masculine given names